Clinton Reed (12 September 1876 – 14 July 1954) was a Barbadian cricketer. He played in one first-class match for the Barbados cricket team in 1899/1900.

See also
 List of Barbadian representative cricketers

References

External links
 

1876 births
1954 deaths
Barbadian cricketers
Barbados cricketers
People from Saint Michael, Barbados